is a railway station in the city of Fukushima, Fukushima Prefecture, Japan operated by East Japan Railway Company (JR East), with a freight terminal operated by the Japan Freight Railway Company.

Lines
Higashi-Fukushima Station is served by the Tōhoku Main Line, and is located 278.8 rail kilometers from the official starting point of the line at Tokyo Station.

Station layout
The station has one island platform connected to the station building by a footbridge. The station is staffed.

Platforms

History
The station was renamed o its present name on June 1, 1978. The station was absorbed into the JR East network upon the privatization of the Japanese National Railways (JNR) on April 1, 1987.

Passenger statistics
In fiscal 2016, the station was used by an average of 730 passengers daily (boarding passengers only).

Surrounding area
Fukushima-Higashi Post Office
Toyo Rubber Fukushima factory
Ohara Medical Center

See also
 List of Railway Stations in Japan

References

External links

  

Stations of East Japan Railway Company
Stations of Japan Freight Railway Company
Railway stations in Fukushima Prefecture
Tōhoku Main Line
Railway stations in Japan opened in 1923
Fukushima (city)